Chrobak or Chrobok may refer to:

Chrobak
 Eugeniusz Chrobak; (pl)
 Ewa Chrobak; (pl)
 Halina Chrobak; (pl)
 Jan Chrobák, Czech cyclo-cross cyclist; (de)
 Krzysztof Chrobak; (pl)
 Marek Chrobak, full professor at University of California
 Rudolf Chrobak (1843-1910), Austrian gynecologist
 Stanisław Chrobak (born 1902), Polish Olympic skier

Chrobok 
 Maksymilian Chrobok; (pl)
 Paweł Chrobok; (pl)

See also
 
 Chrobakowe

Polish-language surnames